Nedra goniosema is a moth in the family Noctuidae. It is found in Mexico.

Xyleninae